Acanthocobitis (Paracanthocobitis) mooreh also known as the Maharashtra zipper loach is a species of ray-finned fish in the genus, or subgenus, Paracanthocobitis. This species is found in the Godavari, Krishna, and Kaveri basins of western and southern India.

References

mooreh
Fish described in 1839
Taxobox binomials not recognized by IUCN